The Bell and Carillon Museum (French: Musée de la Cloche et du Carillon; Dutch: Klokken- en Beiaardmuseum) was a museum from 1992 to 2013 in Tellin in the Belgian Ardennes.

The museum was established in a bell foundry that was in service between 1830 and 1970. Beside bells and carillons it showed other objects, like weather-vanes that had been on church towers. There was also a documentary film shown on the process of molding.

The exploitation of the museum cost the municipality 35,000 euro on a yearly base. As a result it was decided on 28 February 2013 to close the museum at the end of the year. The year after the museum was obtained by the artisan and clock renovator Olivier Baudri that based its atelier there, with the goal to reopen the museum in the future.

Impression

See also 
 List of museums in Belgium
 List of music museums

References 

1992 establishments in Belgium
2013 disestablishments in Belgium
Carillons
Music museums in Belgium
Museums in Luxembourg (Belgium)
Defunct museums
Tellin
Musical instrument museums in Belgium
Museums established in 1992
Museums disestablished in 2013